KK Angeli is a professional basketball club in North Macedonia (Macedonian League). 
It was formed in 2006 Dracevo, Skopje. 
There are youth competitions (generations '91 '92 '93 '94 '95 ' 97). 
Angeli won silver and bronze medals in the season 2007–08, and another bronze medal in the season 2880–09.

Achievements
 Entering professional competing in the 3rd league
 Promoting to the Macedonian Second League
 Won two medals in 2007–08
 Won a bronze medal in 2008–09.

Halls
The gym in RAJKO ZINZIFOV is where the youth players (gen. 1994 and '97) have their trainings). It doesn't have capacity for too much crowd. It doesn't have stands.

The gym in KLIMENT OHRIDSKI recently got new rims. It is a little bigger than the one in Rajko Zinzifov, but it also has no stands. The youth players (gen. '95, '96) train there.

THE DRACEVO HALL is the biggest gym in Dracevo. It has quality rims and backboards, it has original dimensions, long stands for the crowd and quality locker rooms with showers.

Beginning and Third League competition
KK Angeli was formed in 2006 in Dracevo. First Angeli played in the third Macedonian league. Along with Vodnjanski Lisici, they were unstoppable, winning 90% of the games so they entered the second league.

Second League competition
Angeli started poorly in the second league, losing 6 consecutive games and staying at the bottom of the table. Recently they quit the competition.

Staff
President of the team-Blagoja Kečovski

Secretary-Igor Atanasov

Manager-Goran Mojsovski

Media Contact-Martin Gievski

Coaches-B.Kečovski, I.Atanasov, A.Georgievski

Championships
 
The girl team (generation 1995 and 1996) won a silver and bronze medal in the season 2007–08. Those were the first medals since the forming of the club.

The boys from the generation '97 and '98 won the third place in the season 2008–09.

Roster

 Goran Gjorgev

 Oliver Stojmanović

 Jovanče Trajkovski

 Martin Spasovski

 Goran Mojsoski

 Daniel Stojčeski

 Viktor Petreski

 Dragoslav Lihvancev

 Žarko Deskoski

 Almir Advić

 Nermin Ramić

 Nikolče Sekuloski

 Samir Kozica

 Martin Velkoski

 Aleksandar Uzunov

 Risto Janevski

 Žarko Kostovski

References

External links
 Official web-site of KK Angeli
 Forum-site of KK Angeli
 Official Hi5 profile

Basketball teams in North Macedonia